Wytchwood is an adventure video game developed and published by Alientrap for Microsoft Windows, PlayStation, Xbox, Nintendo Switch. The game was released on December 9, 2021.

Gameplay 
Wytchwood is a crafting adventure game set in an expressive land of gothic fables and fairytales. As the mysterious old witch of the woods, players explore a strange countryside, collect magical ingredients, brew sorcerous enchantments, and pass twisted judgement upon a capricious cast of characters and creatures.

Reception 
Writing for Rock Paper Shotgun, Alice Bell wrote "A dark fairy-tale to-do list that takes full advantage of its premise and has a lot of fun with it. You'll fall in love with Wytchwood's no-nonsense crone."

References

External links 
 

2021 video games
Adventure games
PlayStation 4 games
Windows games
Video games about witchcraft
Video games developed in Canada
PlayStation 5 games
Nintendo Switch games
Single-player video games
Indie video games